Wins Above Replacement or Wins Above Replacement Player, commonly abbreviated to WAR or WARP, is a non-standardized sabermetric baseball statistic developed to sum up "a player's total contributions to his team". A player's WAR value is claimed to be the number of additional wins his team has achieved above the number of expected team wins if that player were substituted with a replacement-level player: a player who may be added to the team for minimal cost and effort.

Individual WAR values are calculated from the number and success rate of on-field actions by a player (in batting, baserunning, fielding, and pitching), with higher values reflecting larger contributions to a team's success. WAR value also depends on what position a player plays, with more value going to key defensive positions like catcher and shortstop than positions with less defensive importance such as first base. A high WAR value built up by a player reflects successful performance, a large quantity of playing time, or both.

For example, FanGraphs rates Clayton Kershaw's 2014 regular season performance at 7.9 WAR, suggesting his team won roughly eight more games than would be expected if his innings had been pitched by a replacement level player. Kershaw achieved this high WAR total by pitching many innings while maintaining a high rate of strikeouts and low rates of home runs and walks.

Overview
The basis for a WAR value is the estimated number of runs contributed by a player through offensive actions such as batting and base running, and runs denied to opposition teams by the player through defensive actions like fielding and pitching. Statistics such as weighted on-base average (wOBA), ultimate zone rating (UZR), ultimate base running (UBR), and defense independent pitching statistics (DIPS) measure the effectiveness of a player at creating and saving runs for their team, on a per-plate appearance or per-inning basis. These statistics can be multiplied by the playing time of a player to give an estimate of the number of offensive and defensive runs contributed to their team.

Additional runs contributed to a team lead to additional wins, with 10 runs estimated to be equal to roughly one win. Therefore, a 1.0 WAR value for a player signifies a contribution of roughly 10 more runs than a replacement-level player, over a specified period of time. A replacement-level player is defined by FanGraphs as contributing 17.5 runs fewer than a player of league-average performance, over 600 plate appearances. Therefore, a 1.0 WAR player has contributed an estimated −7.5 runs relative to average over the same number of plate appearances, a 2.0 WAR player has contributed +2.5 runs, and a 5.0 WAR player has contributed +32.5 runs.

For an individual player, WAR values may be calculated for single seasons or parts of seasons, for several seasons, or across the whole career of the player. Collective WAR values for multiple players may also be estimated, for example to determine the contribution a team receives from its outfielders, its relief pitchers or from specific positions such as catcher. It is also possible to extrapolate a future WAR value from a player's past performance data.

Calculation
No clearly established formula exists for WAR. Sources that provide the statistic calculate it differently. These include Baseball Prospectus, Baseball-Reference, and FanGraphs. All of these sources publish the method they use to calculate WAR, and all use similar basic principles to do so.  The version published by Baseball Prospectus is named WARP, that by Baseball-Reference is named bWAR or  rWAR ("r" derives from Rally or RallyMonkey, a nickname for Sean Smith, who implemented that site's version of the statistic) and that for Fangraphs is named fWAR. Compared to rWAR, the calculation of fWAR places greater emphasis on peripheral statistics.

WAR values are scaled equally for pitchers and batters; that is, pitchers and position players will have roughly the same WAR if their contribution to their team is deemed similar. However, the values are calculated differently for pitchers and position players: position players are evaluated using statistics for fielding and hitting, while pitchers are evaluated using statistics related to the opposing batters' hits, walks, and strikeouts in FanGraphs' version and runs allowed per 9 innings with a team defense adjustment for Baseball-Reference's version. Because the independent WAR frameworks are calculated differently, they do not have the same scale and cannot be used interchangeably in an analytical context.

Position players

Baseball-Reference
Baseball-Reference uses six components to calculate WAR for position players: The components are batting runs, baserunning runs, runs added or lost due to grounding into double plays in double play situations, fielding runs, positional adjustment runs, and replacement level runs (based on playing time). The first five factors are compared to league average, so a value of 0 represents an average player.

The term  may be calculated from the first five factors, and the other term from the remaining factor.

Batting runs depends on weighted Runs Above Average (wRAA), weighted to the offense of the league, and is calculated from wOBA.

where

Here, "AB" is the number of at bats, "BB" the number of base on balls ("uBB" is unintentional base on balls and "IBB" is intentional base on balls), HBP the number of times hit by pitch, "SF" the number of sacrifice flies, "SH" the number of sacrifice hits, "1B" the number of singles, "2B" the number of doubles, "3B" the number of triples, "HR" the number of home runs, "SB" the number of stolen bases, and "CS" the number of caught stealing.  to  represent weighting coefficients. Baseball-Reference eliminates pitcher batting results from its data, computes linear weights and wOBA coefficients for each league, then scales the values for each league and season.

The positional adjustment is a value dependent on the player's position: +10.0 for a catcher, −10 for a first baseman, +3.0 for a second baseman, +2.0 for a third baseman, +7.5 for a shortstop, −7.5 for a left fielder, +2.5 for a center fielder, −7.5 for a right fielder, and −15.0 for a designated hitter. These values are set assuming 1,350 innings played (150 games of 9 innings). A player's positional adjustment is the sum of the positional adjustment for each position played by the player scaled to the number of games played by the player at that position, normalized to 1,350 innings.

FanGraphs
The FanGraphs formula for position players involves offense, defense, and base running. These are measured using weighted Runs Above Average, Ultimate zone rating (UZR), and Ultimate base running (UBR), respectively. These values are adjusted using park factors, and a positional adjustment is applied, resulting in a player's "value added above league average". To this is added a scaled value to reflect the player's value compared to a replacement-level player, which is assumed to be 20 runs below average per 600 plate appearances. All four values are measured in runs.

The positional adjustment is a value dependent on the players position: +12.5 for a catcher, −12.5 for a first baseman, +2.5 for a second or third baseman, +7.5 for a shortstop, −7.5 for a left fielder, +2.5 for a center fielder, −7.5 for a right fielder, and −17.5 for a designated hitter. These values are scaled to the number of games played by the player at each position.

Pitchers

Baseball-Reference
Baseball-Reference uses two components to calculate WAR for pitchers: runs allowed (both earned and unearned) and innings pitched. These statistics are then used in a number of further calculations to better contextualize the numbers.

FanGraphs
Rather than focus on actual runs allowed, Fangraphs uses fielding independent pitching (FIP) as their main component to calculate WAR as they feel it better reflects the contributions of the pitcher.

Analysis
In 2009, Dave Cameron stated that fWAR does an "impressive job of projecting wins and losses". He found that a team's projected record based on fWAR and that team's actual record has a strong correlation (correlation coefficient of 0.83), and that every team was within two standard deviations (σ=6.4 wins).

In 2012, Glenn DuPaul conducted a regression analysis comparing the cumulative rWAR of five randomly selected teams per season (from 1996 to 2011) against those teams' realized win totals for those seasons. He found that the two were highly correlated, with a correlation coefficient of 0.91, and that 83% of the variance in wins was explained by fWAR (R2=0.83). The standard deviation was 2.91 wins. The regression equation was:

which was close to the expected equation:

in which a team of replacement-level players is expected to have a .320 winning percentage, or 52 wins in a 162-game season.

To test fWAR as a predictive tool, DuPaul executed a regression between a team's cumulative player WAR from the previous year to the team's realized wins for that year. The resultant regression equation was:

which has a statistically significant correlation of 0.59, meaning that 35% (the square of 0.59) of the variance in team wins could be accounted for by the cumulative fWAR of its players from the previous season.

Usage
WAR is recognized as an official stat by Major League Baseball and by the Elias Sports Bureau, and ESPN publishes the Baseball-Reference version of WAR on its own statistics pages for position players and pitchers.

The importance of WAR compared to typical statistical categories has been the subject of ongoing debate.

For example, nearing the end of the 2012 Major League Baseball season and afterward, there was much debate about which player should win the Major League Baseball Most Valuable Player Award for the American League. The two candidates considered by most writers were Miguel Cabrera, who won the Triple Crown, and Mike Trout, who led Major League Baseball in WAR. The debate focused on the use of traditional baseball statistics, such as RBIs and home runs, compared with sabermetric statistics such as WAR.

Cabrera led the American League in batting average, home runs, and RBIs, but Trout was considered a more complete player by some. Relative to the average player, Cabrera contributed an extra 53.1 runs through batting, but −8.2 through defense and −2.9 through baserunning, while Trout contributed 50.1 batting runs, 13.0 defensive runs, and 12.0 baserunning runs. Cabrera, the only one of the two players whose team entered the postseason, won the award in a landslide, with 22 of 28 first-place votes from the Baseball Writers' Association of America. He and Trout posted similar seasons in 2013; Cabrera again won the MVP. Dave Cameron disagreed, in a FanGraphs article:

Over the last two years, we have seen two of the very best seasons in baseball history, and they've gone essentially unrecognized by the organization that has been tasked with recording history. We have been lucky enough to see an in-his-prime Mickey Mantle in modern times, and instead of celebrating that, we’ve spent Novembers explaining why his teammates' inferiority should keep him from winning an individual award.

Criticisms 
Bill James states that there is a bias favoring players from earlier eras because there was greater variance in skill levels at the time, so "the best players were further from the average than they are now". That is, in modern baseball, it is more difficult for a player to exceed the abilities of his peers than it was in the 1800s and the dead-ball and live-ball eras of the 1900s. James's criticism originates from the evolutionary biologist Stephen Jay Gould who, in 1996, published the book Full House which argued the same point with respect to batting averages. The bias mentioned by Gould and James was confirmed in a statistical study which showed that ranking lists based on WAR do in fact include too many players from the earlier eras. This study challenges the stance that WAR properly adjusts for era differences.

James's criticism has also stemmed from the application and usage of WAR in recent years. In the 2017 Major League Baseball season, there was debate similar to 2012 regarding who should be the recipient of the American League Most Valuable Player Award: Jose Altuve or Aaron Judge. Judge outranked Altuve in FanGraphs' calculation of WAR that season, finishing first with a WAR of 8.2, to Altuve's 7.5. Based on Baseball-Reference's calculation, Altuve had the edge, 8.3 to 8.1. However, in James's words, the usage of WAR in this particular MVP argument was "...nonsense. Aaron Judge was nowhere near as valuable as Jose Altuve….  It is not close. The belief that it is close is fueled by bad statistical analysis.” He goes on to say that WAR,“...is dead wrong because the creators of that statistic have severed the connection between performance statistics and wins, thus undermining their analysis.” He goes on to point out that Judge performed worse than Altuve in critical situations, such as the late innings of close games, and that WAR does not properly take this into account.

Alternatives to WAR 
Some sabermetricians "have been distancing themselves from the importance of single-season WAR values" because some of the defensive metrics incorporated into WAR calculations have significant variability. For example, during the 2012 season, the Toronto Blue Jays employed an infield shift against some left-handed batters, such as David Ortiz or Carlos Peña, in which third baseman Brett Lawrie would be assigned to shallow right field. This resulted in a very high Defensive Runs Saved (DRS) total for Lawrie, and hence a high rWAR, which uses DRS as a component. Ben Jedlovec, an analyst for DRS creator Baseball Info Solutions, said that Lawrie was "making plays in places where very few third basemen are making those plays" because of the "optimal positioning by the Blue Jays". Another fielding metric, Ultimate Zone Rating (UZR), uses the DRS data but excludes runs saved as a result of a shift.

Jay Jaffe, a writer for Baseball Prospectus and a member of the Baseball Writers' Association of America, adapted WAR for a statistic he developed in 2004 called "Jaffe Wins Above Replacement Score," or JAWS. The metric averages a player's career WAR with their seven-year peak WAR (not necessarily consecutive years). The final number is then used to measure the player's worthiness of being inducted into the Baseball Hall of Fame by comparing it to the average JAWS of Hall of Fame players at that position. Baseball-Reference's explanation of JAWS says, "The stated goal is to improve the Hall of Fame's standards, or at least to maintain them rather than erode them, by admitting players who are at least as good as the average Hall of Famer at the position, using a means via which longevity isn't the sole determinant of worthiness."

For example, as of November 30, 2021, retired third baseman Adrián Beltré has accumulated 93.5 career WAR, and 48.7 WAR from his best seven seasons combined. Averaged together, these numbers give Beltré a JAWS of 71.1, which ranks higher than the average JAWS of 55.9 for the 15 third basemen currently in the Hall of Fame. By JAWS' measure, Beltré is a worthy candidate for the Hall of Fame.

See also
 Value over replacement player – another metric for measuring player contribution
 List of Major League Baseball career Wins Above Replacement leaders

Citations

General references 

Baseball statistics